Daniel Leonid Slotnick (1931–1985) was an American mathematician and computer architect. Slotnick, in papers published with John Cocke in 1958, discussed the use of parallelism in numerical calculations for the first time. He later served as the chief architect of the ILLIAC IV supercomputer. He was the principal investigator on a DARPA contract in the early 1970s that produced the ILLIAC IV and the ARPANET. It was a fairly large operation, with its own building on the UIUC campus, originally called the Center for Advanced Computation but which is now the Astronomy Building. ILLIAC IV was constructed by Burroughs Corporation, using some special chips made by Fairchild Semiconductor. Because of campus unrest due to the Vietnam war, and the Mansfield amendments the ILLIAC IV was completed and installed at Ames Research Center instead of UIUC, and Slotnick's Darpa contract was not renewed. In 1985, when IDA and NSA formed their supercomputing research facility in the DC area, Slotnick's widow donated his library to them. In 1987 the first issue of The Journal of Supercomputing contained a tribute to Slotnick.

ARPANET
Most of the development of the ARPANET took place at MIT's Lincoln Labs and BBN Technologies. However it was planned that ILLIAC IV would be on the network, and some work was funded by Slotnick's DARPA contract. For example, a standard character set was established, and also the Purdy Polynomial, a secure hash function to protect passwords on ARPANET. Ironically, when the ILLIAC IV project was moved to Ames Research Center, the computer could only be accessed by telephone.

Awards
He was awarded the AFIPS Prize in 1962 and was elected an IEEE Fellow in 1976.

References

1931 births
1985 deaths
20th-century American mathematicians
Burroughs Corporation people
Computer architects
Researchers in distributed computing
Fellow Members of the IEEE